Frederick VII or Friedrich VII may refer to: 

Frederick VII, Count of Zollern (d. after 6 October 1309)
Frederick VII, Count of Toggenburg (ca. 1370 – 1436)
Frederick VII, Margrave of Baden-Durlach (1647–1709)
Frederick VII of Denmark (1808–1863)